The Killer, also known as The Killer: A Girl Who Deserves to Die is a 2022 South Korean action thriller film directed by Choi Jae-hoon, starring Jang Hyuk as the titular character. It is adapted from a popular novel The Kid Deserves to Die written by Bang Jin-ho.

Plot
Bang Ui-gang is a retired assassin who has settled down with his wife, Hyeon-soo. One day, Hyeon-soo tells Ui-gang that she is going on a holiday in Jeju together with her best friend, and is entrusted to take care of 17-year-old Kim Yoon-ji, the stepdaughter of her best friend. Though reluctant at first, Ui-gang eventually gives in. After sending Hyeon-soo and Yoon-ji's stepmother off in the day, Ui-gang fetches Yoon-ji to Hongdae at night, and goes home after telling her to stay at her friend's house for a few days. Later at home, he gets awaken by Yoon-ji's call and immediately goes to find her, only to realise later that he is fooled by her.

Enraged, Ui-gang heads home and drives away even though he looks back to see Yoon-ji riding away on a bike, with several others. Ui-gang decides to turn back to find her, managing to track her eventual location through a tracking device, which he placed in her wallet earlier. Finding her being threatened by several delinquents, led by Sung-yeon, Ui-gang beats them up and brings Yoon-ji back home. The next night, Ui-gang and Yoon-ji are on the way back home, passing by the same place where he beat up the delinquents. He is stopped by Detective Lee Young-ho, who tells him that there is a murder case in the venue, and then lets him drive off.

The next morning, Detective Lee visits Ui-gang, suspecting him of being a part of the murder, and telling the latter about Yoon-ji's situation. Ui-gang understands her situation as he recalls a flashback which showed him and a teenage girl who wanted to kill herself. Sung-yeon calls Yoon-ji and Ui-gang intercepts the call, where he agrees to meet up, as Sung-yeon has the knife that has Ui-gang's fingerprints, which can be trouble for him if it was turned to the cops. As Yoon-ji's wallet (with the tracker still inside) is with Sung-yeon, he finds the actual venue, and escapes with the knife after fighting a Russian killer named Yuri, who is also trained in the Spetsnaz. He returns home, only to find Yoon-ji being kidnapped.

Ui-gang tracks Sung-yeon to an apartment, and mortally wounds her after seeking information from her about a human trafficking ring that also involves the Russian mafia, and about someone who has requested for Yoon-ji. He visits a hotel linked to the ring, kills numerous delinquents and escapes from Yuri, who tells him where Yoon-ji is. Ui-gang and Detective Lee proceed to the place. After saving her, Ui-gang reveals that he has the knowledge Detective Lee being a corrupt cop assisting in the ring. Ui-gang then gets information from Detective Lee about Park Hyung-joo, who is a part of the ring, and goes to find the latter. He notices an alias Pig Mama in Hyung-joo's phone, a woman who is also a part of the ring.

After finding out from Hyung-joo about the client who requested for Yoon-ji, Ui-gang kills him. He goes to the mansion where the client lives, killing several bodyguards, but is stopped by Detective Lee, who betrays Ui-gang and Yuri. Ui-gang is turned over to the client, who is actually Judge Kim, the Chief Justice of the Supreme Court of Korea, who asks Detective Lee to finish Ui-gang, but the latter breaks free, killing Detective Lee and Yuri. Having killed all the bodyguards, Ui-gang kills Judge Kim after finding out that Pig Mama is Yoon-ji's stepmother, currently on holiday with Hyeon-soo. He heads to Jeju and kills Pig Mama in the outskirts. Together with Yoon-ji, Ui-gang finds Hyeon-soo at a beach in Jeju, where it is revealed that the teenage girl in Ui-gang's flashback is assumed to be Hyeon-soo.

Cast
 Jang Hyuk as Bang Ui-gang, a retired professional killer
 Lee Seo-young (Anne from GWSN) as Kim Yoon-ji, a high school girl 
 Bruce Khan as Yuri, a Russian killer 
 Bang Eun-jung as Sung-yeon, a girl involved in sex trafficking 
 Shin Seung-hwan as Park Hyung-joo, a criminal gang member
 Lee Seung-joon as Lee Young-ho, a detective
 Lee Chae-young as Hyeon-soo, Bang Ui-gang's wife
 Choi Ki-sub as Dotwok, a criminal gang member
 Yoo Seo-jin as Yoon-ji's step-mother/Pig Mama
 Hong Seo-joon as Judge Kim
 Son Hyun-joo as a gun seller (cameo) 
 Cha Tae-hyun as a trauma cleaner (cameo)

Production 
Principal photography began on June 25, 2021 and filming wrapped up in October 2021.

Release 
The film makes its world premiere at the 24th Udine Far East Film Festival on 23 April 2022. It has been pre-sold to 48 foreign countries and districts, including major countries in Europe and Asia. It held a red carpet premiere at the historical Regency Village Theatre in Los Angeles on 20 June 2022, and was released in the theatres simultaneously in North America and South Korea on 13 July 2022.

The film had a special screening at the 21st New York Asian Film Festival on 19 July 2022, as well as the Fantasia International Film Festival on 2 Aug 2022. It was also released in Singapore on 21 July, Taiwan on 22 July, Malaysia on 28 July, Vietnam on 5 August, Saudi Arabia, UAE, Bahrain on 11 August 2022 and Japan on 26 May 2023.

Awards and nominations

References

External links
 The Killer Official North American Website
 The Killer on Amazon
 The Killer on Google Play
 The Killer on Apple iTunes
 The Killer on YouTube
 The Killer on Xbox
 The Killer on Microsoft
 The Killer at Rotten Tomatoes 
 
 
 
 

2022 films
South Korean crime action films
2022 action films
Films based on South Korean novels
Films about the Russian Mafia
Films about contract killing
Films about kidnapping
South Korean gangster films
Gangster films
Films about human trafficking
Works about sex trafficking
Films about prostitution in South Korea